A hypnozygote is a resting cyst resulting from sexual fusion; it is commonly thick-walled. A synonym of zygotic cyst.

References

Cysts
Microbiology